2016 college football season may refer to:

American leagues
2016 NCAA Division I FBS football season
2016 NCAA Division I FCS football season
2016 NCAA Division II football season
2016 NCAA Division III football season
2016 NAIA football season

Non-American leagues
2016 Japan college football season
2016 CIS football season